Derius Davis (born September 11, 2000) is an American football wide receiver and return specialist for the TCU Horned Frogs.

Early years
Davis grew up in St. Francisville, Louisiana and attended West Feliciana High School, where he helped lead the Saints to a 3A state championship as a senior in 2017 and also starred in track, winning the 200-meter dash at the state meet.

Rated as a 3-star prospect, Davis chose to play his college football at Texas Christian University in Fort Worth, Texas over a scholarship offer from Tennessee.  He enrolled at TCU in the summer of 2018.

College career 
Davis scored two touchdowns in his collegiate debut, the Frogs' 2018 season opener, a 55-7 home victory over Southern - first on a 12-yard reception and later on a 73-yard punt return.  In the regular season finale, his 24-yard touchdown reception from Grayson Muehlstein in the 4th quarter helped seal a home victory over Oklahoma State which earned TCU bowl eligibility and a trip to play Cal in the Cheez-It Bowl.  He ended his freshman campaign with 8 receptions for 104 yards.

After catching 11 passes for 151 yards as a sophomore in 2019, Davis took over primary punt return duties from Jalen Reagor as a junior in 2020.  His second and third career punt return touchdowns came in road victories over Baylor and Kansas.  In November, he once again came up with a clutch touchdown reception against Oklahoma State, scoring on a 71-yard pass from Max Duggan in the 4th quarter of the Frogs' 29-22 upset victory over the 15th-ranked Cowboys.

Davis became a much more central part of TCU's offense in 2021, leading the Frogs with 36 receptions and placing second on the team with 536 receiving yards on the season.  He set new career highs with 6 receptions and 106 yards in a home win against Kansas and scored his first career kickoff return against West Virginia.

Taking advantage of the NCAA decision to grant an extra year of eligibility to athletes due to the COVID-19 pandemic, Davis elected to return to TCU for a second senior season in 2022.  He scored the Frogs' first points of the season on a 60-yard punt return for a touchdown, the fourth of his career, in the first half of the opener at Colorado.  In a late September road victory over crosstown rival SMU, Davis caught a short pass from Duggan and took it 80 yards for a touchdown.  On the play, Davis was clocked at a top speed of 23.47mph - becoming the only player in all of college football or the NFL to break the 23 mph barrier in game play.  During TCU's 12-0 start to the season, Davis set a new career high with 7 receptions in a blowout win over 18th-ranked Oklahoma and added touchdown receptions in come-from-behind victories over 19th-ranked Kansas, 17th-ranked Kansas State and Texas Tech.  In the game against Tech, he also notched his fifth career punt return touchdown, an 82-yarder, to break the school record that was previously held by KaVontae Turpin.  At the conclusion of the regular season, he was named the Big 12 Special Teams Player of the Year.

References

External links
TCU Horned Frogs bio

American football wide receivers
Living people
TCU Horned Frogs football players
Players of American football from Louisiana
Year of birth missing (living people)